The O'Kanes were an American country music duo composed of Jamie O'Hara and Kieran Kane, both vocalists and guitarists. Active between 1986 and 1990, the duo recorded three albums for Columbia Records and charted seven singles on the Billboard Hot Country Singles (now Hot Country Songs) chart, including "Can't Stop My Heart from Loving You". Kane charted seven singles of his own in the early 1980s, and O'Hara won a Grammy Award for co-writing "Grandpa (Tell Me 'Bout the Good Ol' Days)", a hit for The Judds. After they disbanded in 1990, both members pursued solo careers, and Kane founded a record label named Dead Reckoning Records.

O'Hara died of cancer on January 7, 2021, at age 70.

Discography

Albums

Singles
{| class="wikitable plainrowheaders" style="text-align:center;"
|-
! rowspan="2"| Year
! rowspan="2" style="width:24em;"| Single
! colspan="2"| Peak positions
! rowspan="2"| Album
|- style="font-size:smaller;"
! width="45"| US Country
! width="45"| CAN Country
|-
| 1986
! scope="row"| "Oh Darlin' (Why Don't You Care for Me No More)"
| 10
| 6
| align="left" rowspan="4"| The O'Kanes
|- 
| rowspan="3"| 1987
! scope="row"| "Can't Stop My Heart from Loving You"
| 1
| 1
|- 
! scope="row"| "Daddies Need to Grow Up Too"
| 9
| 12
|- 
! scope="row"| "Just Lovin' You"
| 5
| 9
|- 
| rowspan="3"| 1988
! scope="row"| "One True Love"
| 4
| 5
| align="left" rowspan="3"| ''Tired of the Runnin|- 
! scope="row"| "Blue Love"
| 10
| 18
|- 
! scope="row"| "Rocky Road"
| 71
| 79
|-
| rowspan="3"| 1990
! scope="row"| "Why Should I"
| —A
| 75
| align="left" rowspan="3"| Imagine That
|-
! scope="row"| "Diddy All Night Long"
| —A
| 73
|-
! scope="row"| "Tell Me I Was Dreaming"
| —
| —
|-
| colspan="5" style="font-size:8pt"| "—" denotes releases that did not chart
|}Notes:'''
A "Why Should I?" and "Diddy All Night Long" did not chart on Hot Country Songs, but both peaked at No. 7 on Hot Country Radio Breakouts.

Music videos

References

1986 establishments in Tennessee
1990 disestablishments in Tennessee
Country music groups from Tennessee
Country music duos
Columbia Records artists
Musical groups established in 1986
Musical groups disestablished in 1990